This article presents lists of the literary events and publications in 1590.

Events
January – The Children of Paul's perform at the English Court twice in the first week; one of the plays act may be John Lyly's Midas. Later this year they are banned from performing over of the involvement of Lily, their chief script-writer, in the Marprelate controversy.
unknown date – The Teatro all'antica at Sabbioneta (Italy), designed by Vincenzo Scamozzi, is completed.

New books
Robert Greene
Greene's Mourning Garment
Never Too Late
Thomas Lodge – Rosalynde
Thomas Nashe – An Almond for a Parrat

New drama
Anonymous (approximate date)
Fair Em, the Miller's Daughter of Manchester
King Leir
Mucedorus
Robert Greene
The Comical History of Alphonsus, King of Aragon (approximate date)
The History of Orlando Furioso
The Scottish History of James the Fourth (approximate date)
with Thomas Lodge – A Looking Glass for London (approximate date)
Christopher Marlowe – Tamburlaine (both parts published)
George Peele – Famous Chronicle of King Edward the First
Robert Wilson – The Three Lords and Three Ladies of London (published)

Poetry
Sir Philip Sidney – Arcadia
Edmund Spenser – The Faerie Queene, Books 1-3

Births
January 30 – Lady Anne Clifford, English literary patron (died 1676)
March 18 – Manuel de Faria e Sousa, Portuguese historian and poet (died 1649)
June 24 – Samuel Ampzing, Dutch poet (died 1632)
July 26 – Johannes Crellius, German-born Polish theologian (died 1633)
September 12 – María de Zayas, Spanish poet and dramatist (died 1661)
October 11 (or December) – William Pynchon, English-born New England theologian (died 1662)
unknown dates
Alonso Andrada, Spanish biographer (died 1672)
François Annat, French anti-Jansenist theologian (died 1670)
Thomas Carve, Irish historian writing in Latin (died c. 1672)
Faqi Tayran, Kurdish poet (died 1660)
Grigore Ureche, Moldavian chronicler (died 1647)
Théophile de Viau, French poet and dramatist (died 1626)

Deaths
January 7 – Jakob Andreae, German theologian (born 1528)
February 1 – Lawrence Humphrey, English theologian (born c. 1527)
March – Petru Cercel, Wallachian prince and poet
July – Guillaume de Salluste Du Bartas, French poet (born 1544)
September 20 – Robert Garnier, French poet (born 1544)
November 23 – André Thévet, French cosmographer (born 1502)
November 29 – Philipp Nicodemus Frischlin, German poet and dramatist (born 1547)
December 5 – Johann Habermann, German theologian (born 1516)
probable
Lambert Daneau, French theologian (born c. 1535)
Giuseppe Leggiadri Gallani, Italian poet and dramatist (born 1516)

References

 
Years of the 16th century in literature